Christabel Oppong Oduro (born November 1, 1992) is a Canadian soccer player who plays as a forward for Turkish club Beşiktaş. She has made five appearances for the Canada women's national soccer team and played domestic football in Canada, the United States, Germany, Israel, Sweden, and Malta.

Personal life 
Oduro is from Brampton, Ontario, Canada. She has Ghanaian heritage, as both of her parents where born in Ghana, and is the cousin of Ghanaian international soccer player Dominic Oduro. Oduro attended St. Thomas Aquinas Secondary School, where aside from soccer, she played basketball as a guard, volleyball, and participated in cross-country running. She studied at the University of Memphis, where she joined their soccer program.

Club career 
In 2014, Oduro signed for Ottawa Fury. In 2015, she signed for German team Herforder SV Borussia Friedenstal (HSV). She scored 10 goals in 20 games for HSV, before leaving the club in 2016 to return to Canada for personal reasons. In 2016, she made 13 appearances and scored 12 goals for the Woodbridge Strikers in League1 Ontario that year. From 2016 to 2019, Oduro played for Israeli team Ramat HaSharon. Ramat HaSharon finished second in the Ligat Nashim twice whilst Oduro was playing with them, and she also won the Israeli Women's Cup with the club. In 2019, she played for IFK Kalmar in the Swedish Elitettan; she made 21 appearances and scored eight goals in the 2019 season. In 2020, Oduro signed for Maltese club Birkirkara. In her second start for Birkirkara, she scored a hat-trick as Birkirkara beat Raiders Luxol 12–0. She has also played for Birkirkara in the 2020–21 UEFA Women's Champions League. In February 2021, Oduro signed for Icelandic 1. deild kvenna side Grindavík. She scored 14 goals in 17 matches for Grindavík. She later played for Woodbridge Strikers in the 2021 Women's League1 Ontario season. Ahead of the 2022 1. deild kvenna season, she signed for Víkingur. In October 2022, Oduro signed for Turkish team Beşiktaş.

International career 
Oduro played for Canada under-20s at the 2012 CONCACAF Women's U-20 Championship, where Canada finished second. She also represented them at the 2012 FIFA U-20 Women's World Cup, where the team failed to reach the knockout stages of the competition.

In March 2012, Oduro received her first call up to the Canada women's national soccer team. She played for Canada in the 2013 Cyprus Women's Cup, where Canada finished second. In total, Oduro has made five appearances, including four starts, for Canada. All of her appearances for Canada were in non-competitive matches. In 2019, Oduro said that she wanted to play for the Ghana women's national football team. She would be eligible as she has not yet played in a competitive fixture for Canada. In 2022, Oduro said that she wanted to switch football nationalities to Ghana.

References 

1992 births
Living people
Canadian people of Ghanaian descent
Canada women's international soccer players
Memphis Tigers women's soccer players
Women's association football forwards
Canadian women's soccer players
Black Canadian women's soccer players
University of Memphis alumni
Grindavík women's football players
Úrvalsdeild kvenna (football) players
Woodbridge Strikers (women) players
Canadian expatriate women's soccer players
Canadian expatriate sportspeople in Germany
Canadian expatriate sportspeople in Israel
Canadian expatriate sportspeople in Sweden
Canadian expatriate sportspeople in Malta
Canadian expatriate sportspeople in Iceland
Soccer players from Brampton
Canadian expatriate sportspeople in Turkey
Expatriate women's footballers in Turkey
Turkish Women's Football Super League players
Beşiktaş J.K. women's football players
Ottawa Fury (women) players
USL W-League (1995–2015) players
Toronto Lady Lynx players
Expatriate women's footballers in Iceland
Expatriate footballers in Malta
Expatriate women's footballers in Germany
Expatriate women's footballers in Sweden
Expatriate women's footballers in Israel
Canadian sportspeople of African descent